Giuseppe Silvestri (1841-1921) was an Italian classical composer and mandolin virtuoso. He is principally remembered today for his role as a mandolinist and for his composition Serenade d'Autrefois (Serenata medioevale or Serenade of Olden Times). He was a celebrated teacher of the mandolin in Naples and Paris, and became popular enough to get the criticism that he was causing Parisians to leave the piano for the mandolin.

His fame spread after the Paris Exhibition of 1878, in which he performed to enthusiastic crowds and reviews. One review said that he made the mandolin produce sounds that resembled those made with the violin, and in other hands the instrument sounded "meagre."

Compositions
Seven of Silvestri's compositions were recorded on Victor Records
 Serenata Silvestri (performed by Neapolitan Trio)
 Elvira (performed by Orchestrina Napoletana)
 Le violette (performed by Orchestrina Napoletana)
 Patria mia (performed by Orchestrina Napoletana)
 Serenata medioevale (performed by tenor, Tito Schipa, with flute and orchestra)
 Sérénade d'autrefois (performed by tenor Tito Schipa, with orchestra)
 Il portavoce valzer (performed by Italian String Trio)

See also
 List of mandolinists (sorted)

References

External links
 Library of Congress online digital recordings of Silvestri's records

1841 births
1921 deaths
19th-century classical composers
19th-century Italian composers
19th-century Italian male musicians
20th-century classical composers
20th-century Italian composers
20th-century Italian male musicians
Italian classical composers
Italian classical mandolinists
Italian male classical composers
Place of birth missing